Magleby Maersk is a  and is one of the largest container ships of the world. The vessel was built at the shipyard of Daewoo Shipbuilding & Marine Engineering under yard number 4255. The vessel is owned and operated by the Danish international shipping company Maersk Line, which is the largest operator of container ships in the world. Magleby Maersk has a capacity of 18,270 TEU.

Design
With these measurements the vessel has capacity for 18,270 TEU. The vessel is certified by American Bureau of Shipping class

Engineering

See also
 
 Largest container shipping companies

References 

2013 ships
Container ships
Merchant ships of Denmark
Ships of the Maersk Line